"Ain't No Man" is a song by American R&B group SWV taken from their fifth studio album "Still" (2016). The song was released digitally on August 7, 2015, through Entertainment One. The song was written by Derrick "Bigg D" Baker, Ayanna Howard, Cainon Lamb, Dennis Lambert and Brian Potter.

Music video
The music video was released to SWV's VEVO account on October 3, 2015 and was directed by Derek Blanks.

Commercial performance
On November 14, 2015, the song charted at number thirteen on the Billboard Adult R&B Songs chart

Track listing

Charts

Release history

References

2015 singles
2015 songs
SWV songs
Songs written by Cainon Lamb
Songs written by Dennis Lambert
Songs written by Brian Potter (musician)
Songs written by Bigg D
MNRK Music Group singles